The Council of Alberta University Students (CAUS) represents the interests of over 140,000 Alberta university students across Alberta.

They represent undergraduate students from the University of Alberta, the University of Calgary, the University of Lethbridge, Athabasca University, Mount Royal University, and MacEwan University to the public, government and other post-secondary education stakeholders. Based in Edmonton, CAUS is a non-partisan and active advocacy group looking to ensure a fully accessible and high quality system of education in Alberta.

History
The Council of Alberta University Students (CAUS) was created in 1986 after the disintegration of the Federation of Alberta Students (FAS). FAS was a provincial umbrella organization that represented all of the public post-secondary institutions in Alberta; the organization fell apart in 1981 when a number of colleges and technical institutes withdrew their membership from the organization because they felt that the universities dominated the Federation. Out of the ashes of the FAS emerged CAUS, which included all of the publicly funded universities in Alberta, and ACTISEC (Alberta Colleges and Technical Institutes Student Executive Council), which represented all of the publicly funded colleges and technical institutes and later became the Alberta Students' Executive Council (ASEC).

The original purpose of CAUS was to facilitate information sharing and networking between university students' unions and associations. Since then, the emphasis of the organization has gone from being a networking group to an active lobbying and advocacy coalition.

In 2014, the student associations of Mount Royal University and MacEwan University became CAUS members, bringing the membership to five. In 2020, the Athabasca University Student Union became the sixth member.

See also
List of Alberta students' associations

References

External links

Students' associations in Canada
Political advocacy groups in Canada
Groups of students' unions
1986 establishments in Alberta
Organizations based in Edmonton